The 1975 East Coast Conference men's basketball tournament was held March 7–8, 1975.  The champion gained and an automatic berth to the NCAA tournament.

Bracket and results

* denotes overtime game

References

East Coast Conference (Division I) men's basketball tournament
Tournament
East Coast Conference (Division I) men's basketball tournament
Easton, Pennsylvania
College basketball tournaments in Pennsylvania
East Coast Conference (Division I) men's basketball tournament